Black Mountains may refer to:

Asia
 Black Mountains (Bhutan)
 Kirana Hills, Pakistan

Europe
 Black Mountain (range), Wales
 Black Mountains (Rhön), Germany
 Black Mountains, Wales and England
 Montagne Noire, in central southern France
 Montagnes Noires, in Brittany, France
 Svartfjella, Svalbard, Norway

North America

 Black Mountains (Arizona)
 Black Mountains (Yavapai County, Arizona), in the Poachie Range
 Black Mountains (California)
 Black Mountains (Nevada)
 Black Mountains (North Carolina)
 Black Mountains (Utah)

See also
 Black Hill (disambiguation)
 Black Hills (disambiguation) 
 Black Mountain (disambiguation)
 Black Rock (disambiguation)